Morocco competed at the 2004 Summer Paralympics in Athens, Greece. The team included 10 athletes, 7 men and 3 women. Six members of the delegation, including three athletes, participated in a study about dental health during the Games.

Medalists

Sports

Athletics

Men's track

Men's field

Women's field

Powerlifting

Men

Women

See also
Morocco at the Paralympics
Morocco at the 2004 Summer Olympics

References 

Nations at the 2004 Summer Paralympics
2004
Summer Paralympics